Philip Lyttelton Gell (1852–1926) was a British editor for Oxford University Press between 1884 and 1896 and President of the British South Africa Company between 1920–1923. Lyttelton Gell was a friend of Alfred Lord Milner, and corresponded frequently with Henry Birchenough and other board members of the British South Africa Company. The Derbyshire record office contains correspondence relating to Gell's involvement with the BSAC as Director (1899–1917, 1923–1925), Chairman (1917–1920) and President (1920–1923). He  was Chairman of Toynbee Hall, Whitechapel, from 1884 to 1896. Through his mother, he was the grandson of Admiral John Franklin. He supported the co-operative movement and the Liberal Unionist Party, and was a literary executor of Benjamin Jowett (1817–1893), Master of Balliol College.

References

British South Africa Company
Oxford University Press people
British editors
1926 deaths
1852 births